Andrew Bodnar is an English bass player who grew up in Clapham, South London. He and drummer Steve Goulding (The Rumour, The Mekons, etc) met and began playing together as a rhythm section while still at school. They spent their teenage years auditioning and busking whenever they could, and were gigging around London with a cajun-influenced band called Bontemps Roulez just prior to forming The Rumour in 1975. Bodnar is probably best known for his membership with Graham Parker and The Rumour (1975-1980), for playing the distinctive reggae-flavored bassline on "Watching the Detectives" by Elvis Costello, and for bass playing and co-writing (with Steve Goulding and Nick Lowe) "I Love the Sound of Breaking Glass" by Nick Lowe.

Bodnar went on to become the Thompson Twins touring bassist, promoting their hit album 'Quick Step & Side Kick' during 1982-83  and since played live, or on recording sessions for many artists, including Angie Bowie, The Pretenders, and Tina Turner. He also played bass for Graham Parker on his various solo albums from 1988 through the mid-1990s. Graham Parker and The Rumour reunited in 2011 to record two new albums, and they toured the UK, US and Europe through to late 2015.

Bodnar played himself in the Judd Apatow film, This Is 40, released in December 2012. He lives in rural North Yorkshire where he continues to write and record as The Punch House Family.

Partial discography

Graham Parker and the Rumour
Howlin' Wind (1976)
Heat Treatment (1976)
Stick to Me (1977)
The Parkerilla (1978)
Squeezing Out Sparks (1979)
The Up Escalator (1980)
Three Chords Good (2012)
Mystery Glue (2015)

The Rumour
Max (1977)
Frogs Sprouts Clogs And Krauts (1978)
Purity Of Essence (1980)

Graham Parker
The Mona Lisa's Sister (1988)
Human Soul (1989)
Struck By Lightning (1991)
Burning Questions  (1992)
Acid Bubblegum (1996)

Other artists
Renowned - Gay & Terry Woods (1976)
"Watching the Detectives" - Elvis Costello (single, 1977)
Carlene Carter - Carlene Carter (1978)
Jesus of Cool - Nick Lowe (1978) (he co-wrote "I Love the Sound of Breaking Glass")
Black & Dekker - Desmond Dekker (1980)
Escape Artist - Garland Jeffreys (1981)
Rock 'n' Roll Adult - Garland Jeffreys (1981)
Learning to Crawl - the Pretenders (1984)
The Rose of England - Nick Lowe (1985)
The Blue Hour - Raise the Dragon (1985)
The Sing Market - The Sing Market (1986)

References

Living people
English bass guitarists
English male guitarists
Male bass guitarists
The Rumour members
1954 births
People from Clapham